Klondike Gold Mine was a roller coaster  at Funland Hayling Island. It was previously installed at  Drayton Manor Theme Park, and transferred in 2005.

History 

The ride was originally installed at Drayton Manor Theme Park in 1984, where it was known as The Python.

In 1995 it was refurbished and renamed to the Klondike Gold Mine. The ride was transferred to Funland Hayling Island in 2005, being replaced by G-Force at Drayton Manor,  replacing a roller coaster already on site, and became one of the main rides at Funland.  It was replaced by Crazy Mouse style ride called Runaway Mine Train (originally from Gulliver's World).

In 2015, the ride was removed from Funland and was sold to Irish company Euroshow. In late 2018, the ride was sold again to Deggeller Attractions in the United States, becoming the only traveling coaster in the country to feature a loop.

References

Roller coasters in the United Kingdom
Roller coasters introduced in 1985
Hayling Island
1985 establishments in England